"Caravan" is the first single from Canadian rock band Rush's 19th studio album, Clockwork Angels. It was released to radio stations and saw digital release on June 1, 2010 (a full two years before the album's proper release), on CD via mail order later that month, and as a 7" vinyl record for Record Store Day 2011, with a limited printing of 3,000 units. The B-side is an additional studio track titled "BU2B", which stands for the lyric "brought up to believe". Both songs were recorded April 13, 2010, at Blackbird Studios in Nashville with producer Nick Raskulinecz with mixing and engineering done by Richard Chycki at the Sound Kitchen in Franklin, Tennessee.  The songs were mastered by Ted Jensen at Sterling Sound in New York City. Live appearances of both songs were first featured on Rush's Time Machine Tour.

Track listing
Music by Lee/Lifeson and lyrics by Peart

Personnel 
Geddy Lee – bass guitar, keyboards, bass pedals, vocals
Alex Lifeson – guitars, keyboards
Neil Peart – drums, lyrics

Chart performance

In other media
The song was released as a downloadable track on Rock Band 3 in 2010. It was also featured in TSN's introductory footage to the CFL game between the Calgary Stampeders and Montreal Alouettes on July 20, 2013.

See also
List of Rush songs

References 

2010 singles
Rush (band) songs
Songs written by Alex Lifeson
Songs written by Geddy Lee
Songs written by Neil Peart
Song recordings produced by Nick Raskulinecz
2010 songs
Atlantic Records singles